Rajkummar Rao is an Indian actor who works in the Hindi film industry. He has received three Filmfare Awards, two Screen Awards and two Zee Cine Awards. He began his career with the experimental anthology film Love Sex Aur Dhokha (2010). After a few brief roles, he had his breakthrough with the drama film Kai Po Che! (2013). He rose to prominence with his portrayal of Shahid Azmi in the critically acclaimed biographical drama Shahid (2013), for which he was awarded the National Film Award for Best Actor and Filmfare Award for Best Actor (Critics). Trapped (2017) earned him another Filmfare Award for Best Actor (Critics).

Asian Film Awards

Asia Pacific Screen Awards

CNN-IBN Indian of the Year

Filmfare Awards

Indian Film Festival of Melbourne

IIFA Awards

National Film Awards

PETA

Producers Guild Film Awards

Star Screen Awards

Zee Cine Awards

See also
 List of accolades received by Queen

References

Lists of awards received by Indian actor